Lalbhai Dalpatbhai College of Engineering (LDCE or LD), is a state college located in Ahmedabad, Gujarat, India.

History
The institute started with 75 students in Civil, Mechanical and Electrical undergraduate programs, and was affiliated to the Bombay University. From 1950 until the formation of the Gujarat Technological University, it was affiliated to the Gujarat University. Currently Dr. Rajul .K. Gajjar former Incharge Vice Chancellor, Principal of Vishwakarma Government College of Engineering acting as Principal Of College.

Programs

The institute runs 14 undergraduate programs, 14 postgraduate programs and 4 part time courses(PDDC)

UG Programs
Civil Engineering
Computer Engineering
Information and Technology
Instrumentation and Control
Electronics and Communication 
Electrical Engineering
Mechanical Engineering
Plastic Technology
Rubber Technology
Textile Technology
Bio Medical Engineering
Automobile Engineering
Environmental Engineering
Chemical Engineering

Post Graduate
Water Resources Management
Transportation Engineering
Geotechnical Engineering
Computer Aided Structural Design
Environmental Management
Textile Technology
CAD/CAM
Cryogenics Engineering
Applied Instrumentation
Communication System
Computer Aided Process Design
Electrical Engineering
Computer Science and Technology
Information Technology
IC Engine and Automobiles
Rubber Technology
MCA

PDDC
Civil Engineering
Electrical Engineering
Mechanical Engineering

Degree programs (full-time): 

 Automobile Engineering
 Biomedical Engineering
 Chemical Engineering
 Civil Engineering
 Computer Engineering
 Electrical Engineering
 Electronics and Communication Engineering
 Environmental Engineering
 Information Technology
 Instrumentation and Control Engineering
 Mechanical Engineering
Plastics Engineering
Rubber technology
 Textile Technology

Postgraduate programs (full-time) 
 Applied Instrumentation
 Automation and Control Power System
 Communication Systems
 Computer Aided Design and Manufacturing
 Computer Aided Process Design
 Computer Aided Structure Analysis and Design
 Computer Science & Technology or Computer Science and Engineering
 Cryogenic Engineering or Cryogenic Engineering 
 Environmental Management
 Geotechnical Engineering
 Information Technology
 Internal Combustion Engines and Automobile
 Master of Computer Application or Master of Science in Information Technology
 Rubber Technology
 Textile Engineering
 Transportation Engineering
 Water Resources and Management or Water resource management

Post Diploma Degree programs (PDDC - B-Tech Part time)
 Civil Engineering 
 Electrical Engineering
 Electronics and Communication Engineering
 Mechanical Engineering

Facilities

Laboratories
Each department has modern, fully equipped laboratories for U.G. and P.G. programs. Most of the laboratories are recognized for testing and standardization by various organizations. New laboratories of the institute are constantly being established in emerging areas. In addition to the students, the laboratories also cater to industrial testing in diverse fields. The campus offers free internet facility to its students & faculty with the majority of the labs equipped with highly configured computers.

Workshop
The workshop is equipped to show students the basic operations of manufacturing and production. It is equipped with a CNC machine, an electro-discharge machine, and measuring instruments. The institute has a thermal workshop in which boilers and other thermal equipment can be studied and an automobile workshop.

Centre of Excellence - Siemens has been established at L. D. College of Engineering. Centre of Excellence has established relevant laboratories having Siemens products and Siemens Industry software applications.

Keepsake Welding Research & Skill development Centre of Excellence has been established at L. D. College of Engineering.

Sports
The college has dedicated a team for major sports like cricket, lawn and table tennis, badminton, kabbadi, football, volleyball etc. College also has its own ground for cricket, football, lawn tennis court and an indoor badminton court. Every year, hundreds of students take part in GTU Sports fest, which is university level sports fest of Gujarat and bring laurels to the college.

Library

The library has 1,03,000 technical books, 173 periodicals, reference books, handbooks, encyclopedias and Indian standards. The library has computerized book search facility.

Training and placement cell
The institute maintains a training and placement cell to help students prepare for job searches. Assistance is given to students in developing interviewing skills. Major industries conduct campus interviews for final year students, and thus some students get their job offers through the cell.

Hostel
The institute has hostel facilities for 787 students. There are two messes in the hostel campus, which are managed by the students. Newspapers and magazines are subscribed for the hostel library. Entertainment facilities include TV room, badminton room, and gymnasium, and outdoor and indoor games.
The hostel is administered by the rector and four wardens.

Canteen
The canteen is located at the center of the campus. This facility is available for the students and staff at reasonable rates.

Clubs 
LD college of engineering also has different clubs including:
 Rotaract Club Of LDCE
Advanature
 FOSS Programming Club
 Innovators Club
 IEEE
 Mind Palace
SAE India Collegiate Club
 Team Robocon LDCE
 Vox Populi
 PRAKALPA

Team Robocon LDCE 

The team takes part in an annual robotics competition named Robocon India, which is the national level competition of ABU Robocon. The team mainly comprises the students from Mechanical, Electronics and communication, Computer Science and Instrumentation and control fields.

In Robocon India 2020, the Team Robocon LDCE secured a 7th rank in the national championship event which was conducted online due to the COVID-19 pandemic.

In Robocon India 2019, the Team Robocon LDCE won the national championship and represented India in the international event of ABU Robocon 2019 held at Ulaanbaatar, Mongolia.

In Robocon India 2018, the team have reached the quarter-finals and won the Best idea award.

The team also organize an annual techno-cultural fest Lakshya in the month of February. In Lakshya Fest 2019 about 9,000 students participated in different events.

College Fest 
Lakshya Fest LDCE

Conveyed and organised by The Robocon Club of LDCE Lakshya is the annual Edu-Tech Festival of L.D. College of Engineering Ahmedabad which is being held for the last 9 years with a unique theme every year. It is a perfect blend of exciting technical and non-technical events and workshops unfolding out of a box of techniques challenges learning and lots of excitement.

Lakshya is an idea which was brought up by the students of Robocon LDCE in the year 2014. Every year a unique theme is created by which Lakshya tries to bring about a constructive change in the society. In 2014 the theme was “Defence Expo” in which guard of honour was given to all the martyrs. In 2015 the theme was “H.R. SUMMIT” wherein HRs of many companies attended the summit and in turn signed MOUs which helped our college students in getting internships and placements. In 2016, an education conclave “SAMVAD-The Education Conclave” was hosted to discuss the education system in the country. A Student Development Forum was set-up to perform the exchange of knowledge and facilities among various colleges of Ahmedabad. Lakshya 2017 brought up the theme “Parivartan – Transforming India”, which focused on the areas concerning Digital India and Skilled India. Lakshya 2018, with the theme “KHWAAB- towards a new era”, focused on future scenario of our country in fields like telecommunication, education infrastructure etc. Lakshya 2019 introduced to people the vivacious side of our nation where India is doing wonders and is way ahead from other countries with the theme of “Noor-e-Swadesh”. Lakshya 2020, with the theme “Saamarthya – redefining the standards of engineering” highlighted the contribution of engineers in improving standard of living of people. Lakshya 2021, with the theme “Perception- revolutionising through critical thinking” which aimed to show the revolutionary changes and evolution in the industries and technologies, resulting from critical thinking. With theme “Anāgata - Divulging the Unprecedented” for Lakshya '22 where to instill the idea that the relation between humans and technology is key to boundless eventuality of transforming notions to reality in almost every applicable field; like the early beginnings of quantum computing and the new and emerging virtual reality.

Alumni 
 
 
 Shiladitya Bora, film producer
 Vyomesh Joshi, CEO of 3D Systems
 Ajay Patel, Chairman of Gujarat State Co-operative Bank and Ahmedabad District Co-Operative Bank

References

External links 

 Official website
 Gujarat University
 All India Council For Technical Education
 National Board of Accreditation

Engineering colleges in Gujarat
Universities and colleges in Ahmedabad
Educational institutions established in 1948
1948 establishments in Bombay State
Lalbhai Group